Max Kablukow Fercondini (born September 1, 1985) is a Brazilian actor, television producer and presenter.

Filmography

Film

Television

References

External links

1985 births
Living people
Male actors from São Paulo (state)
Brazilian people of Italian descent
Brazilian people of Russian descent
Brazilian male telenovela actors
Brazilian male film actors
Brazilian male television actors